Karakadı can refer to:

 Karakadı, Cide
 Karakadı, İnegöl